Edward Key Ellis (born October 13, 1975) is a former American football offensive tackle in the National Football League (NFL) for the New England Patriots, the Washington Redskins, the San Diego Chargers, and the New York Giants.  He played college football at the University at Buffalo and was drafted in the fourth round of the 1997 NFL Draft.

References

External links
 

1975 births
Living people
Players of American football from New Haven, Connecticut
American football offensive tackles
Buffalo Bulls football players
New England Patriots players
Barcelona Dragons players
Washington Redskins players
San Diego Chargers players
New York Giants players